Dinyar Contractor (January 23, 1941 – 5 June 2019) was an Indian stage actor, comedian and Bollywood/Tollywood actor. He acted in Gujarati theatre and Hindi theatre, as well as Hindi movies. He started acting at school and began his professional career in 1966. He started working on television programs with Adi Marzban when Mumbai Doordarshan launched the DD-2 channel in Mumbai with Aao Marvao Meri Saathe, a Gujarati program. He was awarded the Padma Shri in January 2019. He died on 5 June 2019 in Mumbai.

Filmography
Cinema Cinema 1979 as Theatre Owner
Khiladi as Principal
Jawab as Principal
Daraar
Baadshah as Casino Manager
  Kranti(2002 film) as Judge
Jhankaar Beats as Mr Roy
Mujhse Shaadi Karogi as School Principal
Chori Chori Chupke Chupke as general manager of the Hotel
36 China Town as Mr. Lobo, servant

Television

References

External links
 

1941 births
2019 deaths
Indian male stage actors
Gujarati theatre
Male actors in Hindi cinema
Indian male television actors
20th-century Indian male actors
21st-century Indian male actors
Male actors from Mumbai
Recipients of the Padma Shri in arts
Parsi people
Parsi people from Mumbai